The Bhogta (also known as Ganjhu, Pradhan) is an agricultural community, primarily inhabiting in the state of Bihar, Jharkhand and West Bengal. They speak Sadri language as mother tongue except Bhogta of West Bengal, who are adopted Bengali as mother tongue and use Hindi language as link language.

Social structure
The Bhogta are traditionally cultivators and Hindu by religion. The Bhogta of Bihar divided into eight clan, i.e. Damajhwar, Saichumair (Saichuniar), Bhumchuriar (Bhumchuniar), Rimrimria, Pathbhandhi, Musuar, Kmariar (Kawliar), Beharwar and the Bhogta of West Bengal divided into Hans, Mur, Kaua, etc. They use surname like Bhogta, Ganjhu and Singh.

Official classification
As per 1981 census the Bhogta population in Bihar (include Jharkhand) was 137,175 and as per 1952 census their population was 13,807 in West Bengal. They were previously classified as Scheduled Castes for affirmative action. But in 2022, the Bhogta of Jharkhand state are classified as a Scheduled Tribe, as a synonym of Kharwar.

Notable people
Nilamber and Pitamber, freedom fighter in 1857
Jay Prakash Singh Bhogta, politician
Mahendra Prakash Singh Bhogta, politician
Satyanand Bhogta, politician
Nikki Pradhan, hockey player

References

Scheduled Tribes of Jharkhand